San Cercle is an administrative subdivision of the Ségou Region of Mali. The administrative center (chef-lieu) is the town of San.

The cercle is divided into 25 communes:

Baramandougou
Dah
Diakourouna
Diéli
Djéguena
Fion
Kaniegué
Karaba
Kassorola
Kava
Moribila
N'Goa
N'Torosso
Niamana
Niasso
Ouolon
San
Siadougou
Somo
Sourountouna
Sy
Téné
Teneni
Tourakolomba
Waki

References

Cercles of Mali
Ségou Region